Florida Territory was created on March 30, 1822, and was represented by a non-voting delegate to the United States House of Representatives until statehood was achieved on March 3, 1845.  The territory's first delegate, Joseph Marion Hernández, was elected on September 30, 1822, and took his seat in Congress on January 23, 1823.

List of delegates representing the district

References

 Congressional Biographical Directory of the United States 1774–present
 

Territory
Former congressional districts of the United States
At-large United States congressional districts